Wardell's Beach is the historic name of a barrier spit located on the Jersey Shore of the Atlantic Ocean in Monmouth County, New Jersey, United States. It takes its name from Eliakim Wardell, an early owner, and his descendants. Since the 19th century it has been joined physically to Sandy Hook, and contains the boroughs of Monmouth Beach and Sea Bright.

Geography
Wardell's Beach is a very narrow barrier peninsula that separates the Atlantic Ocean from the Shrewsbury River and is opposite the Shrewsbury's confluence with the Navesink River. It is on its southern end joined to the mainland, and joins Sandy Hook to the north.

History
It was described in 1834 as,
 Shrewsbury Inlet closed in late 1848. By 1856 the construction of a railroad along the spit rendered the closing of the inlet more or less permanent.

By 1878 the name Wardell's Beach was falling into disuse, viz,
Since that time, Wardell's Beach is normally only identified under the names of the two municipalities located upon it, Monmouth Beach and Sea Bright.

References

Landforms of Monmouth County, New Jersey
Barrier islands of New Jersey
Peninsulas of New Jersey
Spits of the United States
Beaches of Monmouth County, New Jersey
Beaches of New Jersey